The 26th Golden Disc Awards took place on January 11–12, 2012, at the Kyocera Dome in Osaka, Japan. It honored the best in South Korean music released from January 1, 2011, through November 30, 2011. The event was held outside South Korea for the first time in the ceremony's history since its founding in 1986, as well as the first time at the beginning of the following year instead of December. Leeteuk, Park Gyu-ri, Lee Hong-gi, and Bae Suzy served as the hosts for the event.

Criteria 
The winners of the digital music and album categories were determined by music sales (80%) and a panel of music experts (20%). The Rookie Artist of the Year award was based on album sales (80%), a panel of music experts (10%) and online votes (10%), while the Popularity Award was based on online votes (80%) and album sales (20%).

Winners and nominees

Main awards 
Winners and nominees are listed in alphabetical order. Winners are listed first and emphasized in bold.

Special awards

Controversy 
The event was met with several controversies—including the venue, fairness, recorded broadcasts, and ticket sales. Observers commented that they did not see how Japan was relevant to the awards when sales figures were calculated from South Korea only. Others pointed out that although the Mnet Asian Music Awards is also a South Korean ceremony that have been held abroad, it had various participants from several countries around the world, unlike the Golden Disc Awards where only Korean artists participate.

Complaints were made about the high price of tickets into the show in contrast with the usual lottery system, as the award organizers opted for an indoor baseball stadium instead of a regular concert hall. This led to speculation that the event organizers were more interested in profits than the actual awards ceremony. On top of this, it was broadcast through JTBC's Lunar New Year special instead of being broadcast live, which led to criticisms of the awards being a "JTBC promotional concert" in an attempt to boost the channel's ratings.

The absence of several popular artists such as 2NE1, Big Bang, IU, and T-ara, with them not winning any awards also left controversy over fairness.

References 

2011 in South Korean music
2011 music awards
Golden Disc Awards ceremonies